The 1907 Fairmount Wheatshockers football team was an American football team that represented Fairmount College (now known as Wichita State University) as an independent during the 1907 college football season. In its third season under head coach Willis Bates, the team compiled an 8–2 record, shut out six of ten opponents, and outscored all opponents by a total of 296 to 44.

On November 11, 1907, the team tallied the largest point total in school history, defeating the team from the newly-formed Oklahoma Christian University by a score of 111 to 0. In a game lasting only 45 minutes (25-minute first half and 20-minute second half), the Wheatshockers averaged 2.5 points per minute.

Schedule

References

Fairmount
Wichita State Shockers football seasons
Fairmount Wheatshockers football